Lemyra hanoica is a moth of the family Erebidae. It was described by Franz Daniel in 1953. It is found in Vietnam.

References

 

hanoica
Moths described in 1953